Epitácio Cafeteira Afonso Pereira (June 27, 1924 – May 13, 2018) was a Brazilian politician. He was federal deputy (1975–1987), governor of Maranhão (1987–1990) and senator (1991–1999, 2007–2015).

See also
 List of mayors of São Luís, Maranhão

References 

1924 births
2018 deaths
People from João Pessoa, Paraíba
Brazilian Labour Party (current) politicians
Democratic Labour Party (Brazil) politicians
Progressistas politicians
Reform Progressive Party politicians
Republican Party (Brazil) politicians
Brazilian Democratic Movement politicians
Members of the Federal Senate (Brazil)
Members of the Chamber of Deputies (Brazil) from Maranhão